John Herrera may refer to:
John J. Herrera, American attorney, activist, and leader in the Chicano Movement
John Herrera (gridiron football), American football executive with the NFL's Oakland Raiders
John Herrera (actor), American actor